Andrej Šircelj (born 28 February 1959) is a Slovenian politician who has been serving as Minister of Finance in the government of Prime Minister Janez Janša since 2020.

Early life and education
Šircelj graduated from the Faculty of Economics in Ljubljana and completed his master’s degree at the Faculty of Law at the University of Maribor.

Political career
In the 2011 elections Šircelj became a member of the National Assembly, where he chaired the Committee on Finance and Monetary Policy. He was re-elected as deputy to the National Assembly in the early 2014 elections. During his two terms of office as deputy, he worked in the fields of finance and taxes, chaired the Commission for Public Finance Control and was a member of the Constitutional Commission and the Committee on Foreign Policy.

In addition to his committee assignments, Šircelj was a member of the Slovenian delegation to the Parliamentary Assembly of the Council of Europe. In this capacity, he served – alongside Yuliya Lovochkina – as co-rapporteur for the monitoring of Armenia.

Also during his time in parliament, Šircelj served as president of the board of Slovenia’s Bank Asset Management Company (BAMC), a bad bank which bought up non-performing loans from the country’s largely state-owned banks in 2013 and 2014 to get them off their books. 

When Slovenia held the rotating presidency of the Council of the European Union in 2021, Šircelj chaired the meetings of the Economic and Financial Affairs Council.

Other activities 
 European Bank for Reconstruction and Development (EBRD), Ex-Officio Member of the Board of Governors (since 2020)
 European Investment Bank (EIB), Ex-Officio Member of the Board of Governors (since 2020)
 European Stability Mechanism (ESM), Ex-Officio Member of the Board of Governors (since 2020)
 Inter-American Development Bank (IDB), Ex-Officio Member of the Board of Governors (since 2020)

References 

Living people
1959 births
Place of birth missing (living people)
Finance ministers of Slovenia
21st-century Slovenian politicians